Brent Kops (born 1 November 1982) is a South African cricketer. He played 40 first-class and 23 List A matches between 2001 and 2011. He was also part of South Africa's squad for the 2002 Under-19 Cricket World Cup.

References

External links
 

1982 births
Living people
South African cricketers
Eastern Province cricketers
Cricketers from Port Elizabeth